The 1903 Metropolitan Rugby Union season was the 30th season of the Sydney Rugby Premiership. It was the fourth season run for clubs that represented a district. Eight clubs (seven representing a district, the remaining club representing Sydney University) competed from May till August 1903. The season culminated in the fourth district premiership, which was won by Eastern Suburbs. Eastern Suburbs were crowned premiers by virtue of finishing the season on top of the table.

Teams 
Eight clubs contested the season; seven clubs representing a district and one club representing Sydney University.

Season Summary 
The success of Eastern Suburbs in the 1903 Sydney Rugby Premiership was popular with the football public. This was mostly due to the fact that the club were first-time winners and played the game in a sporting fashion. The team displayed excellent defence, letting in only eight tries during the season. Eastern Suburbs opened the season by defeating Glebe by 4 points to 3, and that victory proved a highly important one to both teams, as, at the close, there was one competition point between them. From start to finish of the season, Eastern Suburbs either held the leading position or shared the lead with another club.

Glebe, who finished second, were the only team who scored at least one try in every match. The club finished strongly by winning the last 6 rounds of the season. As a pack they were superior to that of any other team, excepting Eastern Suburbs. At no time did they equal the best of their form in other seasons.

After a bit of a slow start to the season, Newtown began to display outstanding brilliance in attack. This led them to move quickly up the ladder and finish the season in a strong third place. Newtown were the most brilliant all-round team in the competition, yet lacked that solidity.

At the conclusion of the season, the Rugby world saw the shock death of another of their players. Wallace Millican, three-quarter for Newtown, died of blood poisoning on 30 August after spending most of the week confined to his bed. Millican was 21 years old and hugely popular amongst the Newtown followers.

Ladder

Ladder Progression 

 Numbers highlighted in blue indicates the team finished first on the ladder in that round.
 Numbers highlighted in red indicates the team finished in last place on the ladder in that round

Statistics

Points

Tries

Lower Grades 
The MRFU also conducted Second Grade and Boroughs competitions this season.

Second Grade 
Ten teams participated in the Second Grade competition: the eight First Grade clubs entered a team each, in addition two Boroughs clubs, Willoughby and Manly, were permitted to each enter a team. The season concluded with Newtown undefeated at the top of the table by a margin of 8 points. They were therefore declared premiers.

Boroughs Competition 
Seventeen teams participated in the Boroughs Competition. The teams were split into two divisions of nine teams. In Division A was North Sydney, Willoughby, Mosman, Manly, East Sydney, Surrey Hills, Redfern, Balmain and Gipps. In Division B was Newtown, University, Waterloo, Rockdale, Glebe, Annandale, Leichhardt and Ashfield. At the end of the regular games, North Sydney finished at the top of Division A and Glebe finished at the top of Division B. The final saw Gipps beat Balmain 11 points to 6 to take the premiership.

Participating clubs

Footnotes

References

 Sydney Club Rugby History.
"Eastern Suburbs Club Premiers", Referee (Sydney, NSW: 1886 - 1939). 1903-08-26. p. 8. 

1903 in Australian rugby union
Rugby union competitions in New South Wales